Jesse Plemons (born April 2, 1988) is an American actor. He began his career as a child actor and achieved a career breakthrough with his major role as Landry Clarke in the NBC drama series Friday Night Lights (2006–2011). He subsequently portrayed Todd Alquist in season 5 of the AMC crime drama series Breaking Bad (2012–2013) and its sequel film El Camino: A Breaking Bad Movie (2019). For his role as Ed Blumquist in season 2 of the FX anthology series Fargo (2015), he received his first Primetime Emmy Award nomination and won a Critics' Choice Television Award. He received a second Emmy nomination for his portrayal of Robert Daly in "USS Callister", an episode of the Netflix anthology series Black Mirror (2017).

Plemons has appeared in supporting roles in several films including The Master (2012), The Homesman (2014), Black Mass, Bridge of Spies (both 2015), Game Night, Vice (both 2018), The Irishman (2019), Judas and the Black Messiah, Jungle Cruise, and The Power of the Dog (all in 2021). He starred in the psychological thriller film I'm Thinking of Ending Things (2020). He was nominated for the Independent Spirit Award for Best Male Lead for his role as David Mulcahey in Other People (2016). For his performance in The Power of the Dog, he was nominated for a BAFTA Award for Best Actor in a Supporting Role and the Academy Award for Best Supporting Actor.

Early life
Plemons was born in Dallas and raised in Mart, Texas, near Waco. He has an older sister named Jill.

In 2007, Plemons graduated from the Texas Tech University Independent School District, a distance learning program, which allowed him to earn his high school diploma. He attended schools in Mart, playing football in middle school, junior high, and at Mart High School, until he received more acting jobs and shifted to the online program.

Career

1991–2006: Early career
Plemons got his start in a Coca-Cola commercial when he was  years old. When he was 8 years old, he started doing extra work, and with the support of his family, spent time auditioning in Los Angeles and landing small jobs.

After appearing in the films Varsity Blues (1999) and All the Pretty Horses (2000), and guest-starring on Walker, Texas Ranger and Sabrina, the Teenage Witch, Plemons' first prominent role was in the film Children on their Birthdays (2002). He later appeared in Like Mike (2002) and When Zachary Beaver Came to Town (2003), with guest roles on the television series Judging Amy, The Lyon's Den, CSI: Crime Scene Investigation, and Grey's Anatomy between 2003 and 2006.

2006–2011: Breakthrough with Friday Night Lights

In 2006, when he was 18, Plemons joined the ensemble cast of NBC's television series Friday Night Lights, filmed in Austin, Texas, detailing the fictional events surrounding a high school football team in fictional Dillon, Texas. In the show's first season, his character Landry Clarke provided comic relief as the best friend of football quarterback Matt Saracen, though Landry himself was not on the team. Among the cast and crew, the joke was that Plemons played football better than most of the other actors, even though his character was one of the few who did not play.

Landry joined the Panthers football team in the second season, and Plemons, having played high school football, told director Jeffrey Reiner that he would do his own stunts. In his first football scene, Landry had to "get the crap beat out of [him] over and over and over again". When hit by co-star Taylor Kitsch (playing Tim Riggins) Plemons' chin split open, requiring eleven stitches. The show, a fan and critic favorite, ended after five seasons after shifting to DirecTV in 2011.

In 2012, Plemons reunited with Kitsch and Friday Night Lights creator Peter Berg in the film Battleship. Berg, who directed the film, explained that he knew how comfortable Kitsch was with Plemons: "I know that he's really good for Taylor and he makes Taylor better. So, I wrote that whole part for Jesse. I never thought of it as a Friday Night Lights reunion. I thought of it as protection, bringing a trusted family member in."

2011–present: Breaking Bad, Fargo, and film breakthrough
From 2012 to 2013, Plemons portrayed the psychopathic Todd Alquist during the final season of the AMC drama series Breaking Bad. He was a recurring cast member in Season 5A and was promoted to series regular for Season 5B. Fans of Breaking Bad nicknamed him "Meth Damon", due to Plemons' resemblance to actor Matt Damon. One of his first film roles, at age 12, was playing the younger version of Damon's character in the film All the Pretty Horses (2000). 

In 2012, Plemons also had a supporting role in the Paul Thomas Anderson drama The Master as the son of Philip Seymour Hoffman's character, an actor to whom his physical appearance has been compared.

In January 2014, Plemons was in consideration to be one of the new stars of Star Wars Episode VII (Star Wars: The Force Awakens). In March 2014, Plemons, along with four other actors, were being considered for the lead role of Finn in Episode VII. The role, however, went to British actor John Boyega. Plemons played mobster Kevin Weeks in the Boston-set mob film Black Mass, starring Johnny Depp, which opened in theaters in September 2015. Also that year, he appeared in the Stephen Frears film about Lance Armstrong, The Program, and the Steven Spielberg film Bridge of Spies.

In late-2015, Plemons co-starred in the second season of the TV show Fargo. He portrayed Ed Blumquist, a butcher and the husband of Peggy Blumquist (Kirsten Dunst). For his performance, he was nominated for the Primetime Emmy Award for Outstanding Supporting Actor in a Limited Series or Movie.

In 2016, Plemons starred in the film Other People. In 2017, he appeared in the Doug Liman thriller film American Made, the Scott Cooper western Hostiles, and Steven Spielberg's historical drama The Post.

In December 2017, Plemons appeared in "USS Callister", an episode in the fourth series of the anthology show Black Mirror. Plemons played Robert Daly, the episode's main character and a sadistic introvert. Plemons received acclaim for his performance and was nominated for the Primetime Emmy Award for Outstanding Lead Actor in a Limited Series or Movie. In 2018, Plemons had supporting roles in two films, the comedy Game Night and Adam McKay's Dick Cheney biopic Vice, which he narrated. In 2019 he had a supporting role in the Martin Scorsese crime drama The Irishman, which premiered at the New York Film Festival on September 27, 2019. He also reprised his role as Todd Alquist in El Camino: A Breaking Bad Movie.

In 2020, Plemons received critical praise and a Gotham Independent Film Award nomination for Best Actor for his lead performance in Charlie Kaufman's psychological drama I'm Thinking of Ending Things. In 2021, Plemons gave supporting performances in the critically acclaimed Judas and the Black Messiah, a film about civil rights activist Fred Hampton and the Disney adventure film  Jungle Cruise. In the same year, Plemons starred in the supernatural horror film Antlers, again collaborating with director Scott Cooper, and starred once again alongside his real life partner and Fargo co-star Kirsten Dunst in Jane Campion's western drama The Power of the Dog, for which he has received praise and a number of award nominations including the Academy Award for Best Supporting Actor. In 2022, Plemons starred in Charlie McDowell's noir thriller Windfall, which also marked his first credit as a producer.

Upcoming projects

In 2021, Plemons was announced to be reuniting with Martin Scorsese for a lead role in his western-thriller, Killers of the Flower Moon, which he will star in alongside Leonardo DiCaprio, Lily Gladstone and Robert De Niro. 

In May 2021, it was announced that Plemons would star alongside Elizabeth Olsen in the HBO Max true crime series Love and Death.

In September 2022, Plemons was announced to be starring alongside Emma Stone, Willem Dafoe and Margaret Qualley in Yorgos Lanthimos' film And.

Personal life
Plemons began a relationship with his Fargo co-star Kirsten Dunst in 2016. They got engaged in 2017. Their son was born in 2018. In 2021, Dunst gave birth to the couple's second child.  In February 2022, both were nominated for Academy Awards for their roles in The Power of the Dog. Plemons and Dunst were married in July 2022.

Filmography

Film

Television

Accolades

References

External links
 

1988 births
21st-century American male actors
American male child actors
American male film actors
American male television actors
Living people
Male actors from Dallas
People from Mart, Texas
Rice University people
Texas Tech University alumni